Badal Rahman (June 4, 1949June 11, 2010 ) was a Freedom Fighter of Bangladesh Liberation War 1971, Bangladeshi film director, Film Society Activist, Writer & Cultural Personality. In 1980 he became the first director to create a full-length feature film for children in Bangladesh, Emiler Goenda Bahini. The film was an adoption of Erich Kästner's novel Emil und die Detektive published in 1929.

Biography
Rahman completed his diploma in film editing from the Film and Television Institute of India. In 1974, he, along with Syed Salahuddin Zaki made his first film, Prottashar Shurjo. After directing Emiler Goenda Bahini, he made two more children's films - Kanthal Burir Bagan and Chhana O Muktijuddha, both films funded by Bangladesh Shishu Academy.

Rahman served as the president of the Federation of Film Societies of Bangladesh (FFSB) until his death.

Rahman had two daughters and one son Abhishek.

Legacy
In 2011, filmmakers Belayat Hossain Mamun and Saiful Islam Jarnal jointly directed a documentary based on Rahman's life. Dhaka International Film Festival
renamed Best Children Film Award as Badal Rahman Award.

Moviyana Film Society organize Badal Rahman Memorial Lecture every year. 

Moviyana Film Society consistently remembered late filmmaker Badal Rahman 2011 to 2018

Works
 Emiler Goenda Bahini (1980)
 Prottashar Shurjo (1974)
 Kathal Burir Bagan (1988)
 Chhana O Muktijuddha (2009)

Awards
Badal Rahman was honored Golden Jubilee Memorial Honours from Bangladesh Chalachchitra Sangsad Andolon (BCSA).

References

External links
 

1949 births
2010 deaths
Bangladeshi film directors
Best Editor National Film Award (Bangladesh) winners